Pengold is a hamlet near St Gennys in Cornwall, England, UK. Pengold is southwest of Higher Crackington.

References

Hamlets in Cornwall